Cubbage Pond (also known as Cabbage Pond) is a reservoir on Cedar Creek in Sussex County, Delaware, United States, about  east of Lincoln.

Cubbage Pond Mill has stood on this site since about 1785, built originally by John and William Draper. Samuel Draper, eldest son of William Draper, inherited it around 1821 and sold it to Lemuel Shockley. John C. Davis owned the mill from 1833 to 1863, then Charles M. Miles was owner from 1866 to 1879. Subsequent owners were John Dubois (owned 1879–1881), Mark H. Davis (owned 1881–1892), Frank Davis (owned 1892–1908). It was last operated by Samuel Cubbage from 1908 to 1917. He died in 1917 and the mill was inherited by his widow Ida.

References

Reservoirs in Delaware